The Royal Philatelic Society of Victoria is a philatelic society based in Melbourne, in the state of Victoria, Australia.

History 
The society was founded in Melbourne in 1892 as The Philatelic Society of Victoria and it received the "Royal" prefix in 1947.

Aims 
The aims of the society are to:

Promote the hobby of philately in all aspects.
Promote and support the art, education, study, research, activity, interests and status of philately in the State of Victoria.
Promote fellowship among philatelists.
Encourage interest in philately generally.

Activities 
As well as holding regular meetings, the society publishes books and has an expertising service.

Selected publications of the society 
The Philatelic Society of Victoria 1892-1926, A.J. Derrick, 1926.
Catalogue of the Australian National Philatelic Exhibition, 1950.
The Postal History of Port Phillip District 1835-1851, J.R.W. Purves, 1950.
New South Wales Numeral Cancellations, Alan G. Brown & Hugh M. Campbell, 1963. (With Robson Lowe Ltd.
The Pictorial Stamps of Tasmania 1899-1912, K.E. Lancaster, 1986.
Century of Happiness: The Centennial History of the Royal Philatelic Society of Victoria, H.L. Chisholm, 1992. (J.R.W. Purves Memorial Series No.12)
The Royal Philatelic Society of Victoria Library: A history and catalogue, Geoffrey Kellow & Russell Turner, 1996. .
The Numeral Cancellations of Victoria, Hugh H. Freeman & Geoff T. White, (2001). 
The Half-Lengths of Victoria: The Stamps and Postal History 1850-59, J.H. Barwis & R.W. Moreton, 2009.

References

External links
 https://www.rpsv.org.au/
Philatelic organizations
Organisations based in Australia with royal patronage
1892 establishments in Australia
Philately of Australia
Organisations based in Melbourne